The Indian River Life-Saving Station was established at Rehoboth Beach, Delaware in 1876 to rescue mariners shipwrecked along the Delaware coast, as part of the United States Life-Saving Service. It was designed in 1874 as a -story board-and-batten frame structure with decorative brackets supporting overhanging eaves in a version of the Queen Anne style. It sheltered a surfboat which could be quickly rolled out through double doors facing the beach and down a ramp to the water. The main station house remains of what was once a complex that included a barn, stable, meat house, feed house and privy. An auxiliary boathouse stood about a mile to the south. The original plans for the station survive.

The facility was moved back from the water's edge in 1877 due to coastal erosion. In 1915, the United States Life-Saving Service merged with the Revenue Cutter Service to form the United States Coast Guard. The station was converted to a Coast Guard station and occupied until the Ash Wednesday Storm of 1962, which left it partially buried in sand. A new Coast Guard station was built nearby in 1964. The original station was restored by the Delaware Seashore Preservation Foundation, and is now operated as the Indian River Life-Saving Station Museum by Delaware State Parks, as part of Delaware Seashore State Park.

The Indian River Life Saving Service Station was placed on the National Register of Historic Places on September 29, 1976.

References

External links
 Indian River Life-Saving Station at Delaware Seashore State Park

Government buildings on the National Register of Historic Places in Delaware
Buildings and structures in Sussex County, Delaware
Life-Saving Service stations
Museums in Sussex County, Delaware
Maritime museums in Delaware
National Register of Historic Places in Sussex County, Delaware
Life-Saving Service stations on the National Register of Historic Places